Lakshan Jayasinghe (born 27 May 1995) is a Sri Lankan first-class cricketer. He was part of Sri Lanka's squad for the 2014 ICC Under-19 Cricket World Cup.

References

External links
 

1995 births
Living people
Sri Lankan cricketers
People from Colombo District